Anatolii Asirovich Goldberg (April 2, 1930 in Kyiv – October 11, 2008 in Netanya) was a Soviet and Israeli mathematician working in complex analysis. His main area of research was the theory of entire and meromorphic functions.

Life and work

Goldberg received his PhD in 1955 from Lviv University under the direction
of Lev Volkovyski. He worked as a docent in Uzhgorod University (1955–1963), then in Lviv University (1963–1997), where he became a full professor in 1965, and in Bar Ilan University (1997–2008). Goldberg, jointly with I.V. Ostrovskii and B.Ya. Levin, was awarded the State Prize of Ukraine
in 1992.

Among his main achievements are:
 construction of meromorphic functions with infinitely many deficient values,
 solution of the inverse problem of Nevanlinna theory for finitely many deficient values,
 development of the integral with respect to a semi-additive measure.

He authored a book  and over 150 research papers.

Several things are named after him: Goldberg's examples,
Goldberg's constants, and Goldberg's conjecture.

Selected publications

 , translated as

References

External links 

 
 
 The International conference on complex analysis and related topics dedicated to the 90-th anniversary of Anatolii Asirovich Goldberg (1930-2008)

Ukrainian Jews
Ukrainian mathematicians
Israeli Jews
Israeli mathematicians
1930 births
2008 deaths
Complex analysts
Mathematical analysts